The Chambal River is a tributary of the Yamuna River in Central and Northern India, and thus forms part of the drainage system of the Ganges. The river flows north-northeast through Madhya Pradesh, running for a time through Rajasthan then forming the boundary between Rajasthan and Madhya Pradesh before turning southeast to join the Yamuna in Uttar Pradesh state.

It is a legendary river and finds mention in ancient scriptures. The perennial Chambal originates at Janapav, south of Mhow town, near Manpur, Indore, on the south slope of the Vindhya Range in Madhya Pradesh. The Chambal and its tributaries drain the Malwa region of northwestern Madhya Pradesh, while its tributary, the Banas, which rises in the Aravalli Range, drains southeastern Rajasthan. It ends a confluence of five rivers, including the Chambal, Kwari, Yamuna, Sind, Pahuj, at Pachnada near Bhareh in Uttar Pradesh state, at the border of Bhind and Etawah districts.

The Chambal River is considered pollution free, and hosts a diverse riverine faunal assemblage including two species of crocodilians – the mugger and gharial, eight species of freshwater turtles, smooth-coated otters, gangetic river dolphins, skimmers, black-bellied terns, sarus cranes and black-necked storks, amongst others. Charmanwati (also spelled Charmanvati) is a river mentioned in the epic Mahabharata. It is believed that the ancient name of Chambal river was Charmanvati, meaning the river on whose banks leather is dried. In due course of time, this river became famous as the river of ‘charman’ (skin) and was named as Charmanvati.

Origin, drainage and mouth

The Chambal flows for another  between M.P. and Rajasthan and a further  between M.P. and Uttar Pradesh (U.P.).

It falls for another  in the next , where it enters the gorge past the Chaurasigarh Fort. During the next  of its run from the Chaurasigarh Fort to Kota city, the bed falls by another . For the rest of its  run, the river passes through the flat terrain of the Malwa Plateau and later the Gangetic Plain with an average gradient of 0.21 m/km.

The drainage area resembles a rectangle up to the junction of the Parvathi and Banas Rivers with the Chambal flowing along its major axis. The Chambal Basin lies between latitudes 22° 27' N and 27° 20' N and longitudes 73° 20' E and 79° 15' E. On its south, east and west, the basin is bounded by the Vindhyan mountain ranges and on the north-west by the Aravallis. Below the confluence of the Parvathi and Banas, the catchment becomes narrower and elongated. In this reach, it is bounded by the Aravalli mountain ranges on the North and the Vindhyan hill range on the south.

The Vindhyan scarps, in the northwest, flank the left bank of the Chambal, and subsequently, is mainly drained by it. The Chambal rising within about 16 km of the Narmada river, appears as a consequent on the Mesozoic surface, superimposed on the scarps, and cuts straight through them, with subsequent tributaries on the softer shales. It is a typical anterior-drainage pattern river, being much older than the rivers Yamuna and Ganges, into which it eventually flows.

The tributaries of the Chambal include Shipra, Choti Kalisindh, Sivanna, Retam, Ansar, Kalisindh, Banas, Parbati, Seep, Kuwari, Kuno, Alnia, Mej, Chakan, Parwati, Chamla, Gambhir, Lakhunder, Khan, Bangeri, Kedel and Teelar.Lallanji Gopal, Vinod Chandra Srivastava (2008). History of agriculture in India (up to c. 1200 A.D.). In History of Science, Philosophy and Culture in Indian Civilization. Project of History of Indian Science, Philosophy and Culture. Centre for Studies in Civilizations.

According to Crawford (1969), the Chambal river valley is part of the Vindhyan system which consists of massive sandstone, slate and limestone, of perhaps pre-Cambrian age, resting on the surface of older rocks.
Hillocks and plateaus represent the major landforms of the Chambal valley. The Chambal basin is characterised by an undulating floodplain, gullies and ravines. The Hadauti plateau in Rajasthan occurs in the upper catchment of the Chambal River to the southeast of the Mewar Plains. It occurs with the Malwa plateau in the east. Physiographically, it can be divided into Vindhyan scarp land and Deccan Lava (Malwa) plateau. According to Heron (1953), the eastern pediplain, occurring between the Vindhyan plateau and the Aravalli hill range, contains a thin veneer of Quaternary sediments, reworked soil and river channel fills. At least two erosional surfaces can be recognised within the pediplain are the Tertiary age. The Vindhyan upland, the adjoining Chambal valley and the Indo-Gangetic alluvial tract (older alluvium) are of Pleistocene to Sub-recent age. Badland topography is a characteristic feature of the Chambal valley, whereas kankar has extensively developed in the older alluvium.

Vegetation

The area lies within the semi-arid zone of north-western India at the border of Madhya Pradesh, Rajasthan and Uttar Pradesh States, and the vegetation consists of ravine, thorn forest, a sub-type of the Northern Tropical Forests (Sub-group 6B/C2 of the revised classification of Champion & Seth, 1968). This sub-type typically occurs in less arid areas with 600–700 mm rainfall. Limited examples of Saline/Alkaline Babul Savannah (5E/8b), a type of Northern Tropical Dry Deciduous Forest, also occurs. Evergreen riparian vegetation is completely absent, with only sparse ground-cover along the severely eroded river banks and adjacent ravine lands.

The semiarid tract in Madhya Pradesh is represented by Chambal catchment extending up to Narmda and Betla Rivers. Over 1000 flowering plants have bean reported including Anogeissus latifoia, A. pendula, Tectona grandis, Lannea coromandelica, Diospyros melanoxylon, Sterculia urens, Mitragyna parviflora, Butea monosperma, Emblica officinalls, Boswellia serrata, Bridelia squamosa and Hardwickia binata. Species composition at shrub and ground layer is similar to that of semiarid regions of Gujarat. 
A few climbers of this area include species of Rhynchosia, Atylosia, Cocculus, Cissampelos, Ipomoea, Pergularia daemia, Pueraria tuberosa and Tinospora cordifolia.

Thorny bushes or small trees commonly found in this area include Capparis deciduas, Capparis sepiaria, Balanites aegyptiaca, Acacia senegal, A. nilotica, A. leucophloea, Prosopis juliflora, Butea monosperma, Maytenus emarginata, Tamarix sp., Salvadora persica, S. oleoides, Crotalaria medicaginea, C. burhia, Clerodendrum phlomidis, Calotropis procera, Xanthium indicum and Leptadenia pyrotechnica associated with climbers such as Maerua oblongifolia, Pergularia daemia, Ceropegia bulbosa, herbs e.g., Argemone mexicana, Farsetia hamiltonii, Tephrosia purpurea, Cleome viscosa, Tribulus terrestris, Glinus lotoides, Sericostoma pauciflorum, Rivea sp., Ipomoea sp., Pedalium murex, Sesamum mulayanum, Lepidagathis sp, Boerhavia diffusa, Chrozophora sp., and grasses like Cyprus sp., Fimbristylis sp., Brachiaria sp., Cenchrus sp., Dichanthium sp., etc.

National Chambal Sanctuary

The National Chambal Sanctuary lies between 24°55' to 26°50' N and 75°34' to 79°18'E in Dholpur. It consists of the large arc described by the Chambal between Jawahar Sagar Dam in Rajasthan and the Chambal-Yamuna confluence in Uttar Pradesh. Over this arc, two stretches of the Chambal are protected as the National Chambal Sanctuary status - the upper sector, extending from Jawahar Sagar Dam to Kota Barrage, and the lower sector, extending from Keshoraipatan in Rajasthan to the Chambal-Yamuna confluence in Uttar Pradesh.

The sanctuary was gazetted 'in order to facilitate the restoration to "ecological health" of a major north Indian river system and provide full protection for the gravely endangered gharial (Gavialis gangeticus).

Administrative approval of the Government of India for the establishment of the National Chambal Sanctuary was conveyed in Order No. 17-74/77-FRY (WL) dated 30 September 1978. The Sanctuary has sanctuary status declared under Section 18(1) of the Wildlife Protection Act, 1972. Since such a declaration is carried out by individual states for territory falling within their jurisdiction, there are three separate notifications covering the National Chambal Sanctuary - the Madhya Pradesh portion was gazetted in the Government of Madhya Pradesh Notice No. F.15/5/77-10(2) dated 20 December 1978, the Uttar Pradesh portion was gazetted in the Government of Uttar Pradesh Notice No. 7835/XIV-3-103-78 dated 29 January 1979 and the Rajasthan portion was gazetted in the Government of Rajasthan Notice No.F.11(12)Rev.8/78 dated 7 December 1979.

Dams on the Chambal

In a stretch of 96 km, from km 344 to km 440 from its source, the Chambal flows through a deep gorge, while lower down, there are wide plains. The Gandhisagar Dam is located near the center of this reach. As there is a deep gorge immediately upstream of the dam, the reservoir has a large storage capacity despite its comparatively low height. For the next 48 km, the river flows through the Kundal Plateau, and the Rana Pratap Sagar Dam is constructed at the lower end of this. The topography permits fairly good storage upstream of the dam. Further down, the Jawahar Sagar Dam is located in the middle of the Kota gorge. The Kota Barrage is located near Kota town, where the river emerges from the gorge section into the plateau. The total area draining the Kota Barrage is 27,319 km2.

The Chambal River is used for hydropower generation at Gandhi Sagar dam, Rana Pratap Sagar dam and Jawahar Sagar Dam and for annual irrigation of 5668.01 square kilometres in the commands of the right main canal and the left main canal of the Kota Barrage.

The Gandhi Sagar dam is the first of the four dams built on the Chambal River, located on the Rajasthan-Madhya Pradesh border. It is a 64 metre high masonry gravity dam, with a live storage capacity of 6,920 MCM (million cubic metres) and a catchment area of 22,584 km2, of which only 1,537 km2 is in Rajasthan. The dam was completed in the year 1960. The hydro-power station comprises five generating units of 23 MW capacity each. The water released after power generation is used for irrigation through Kota Barrage.

The Rana Pratap Sagar dam is a dam located 52 km downstream of Gandhi Sagar dam on across the Chambal River near Rawatbhata in Chittorgarh district in Rajasthan. It was completed in the year 1970 and it is the second in the series of Chambal Valley Projects. It is 54 meters high. The power house is located on the left side of the spillway and consists of 4 units of 43 MW each, with firm power generation of 90 MW at 60% load factor. The total catchment area of this dam is 24,864 km2, of which only 956 km2 are in Rajasthan. The free catchment area below Gandhi Sagar dam is 2,280 km2. The live storage capacity is 1,566 MCM.

The Jawahar Sagar Dam is the third dam in the series of Chambal Valley Projects, located 29 km upstream of Kota city and 26 km downstream of Rana Pratap Sagar dam. It is a concrete gravity dam, 45 meter high and 393 m long, generating 60 MW of power with an installed capacity of 3 units of 33 MW. The work was completed in 1972. The total catchment area of the dam is 27,195 km2, of which only 1,496 km2 are in Rajasthan. The free catchment area below Rana Pratap Sagar dam is 2,331 km2.

The Kota Barrage''' is the fourth in the series of Chambal Valley Projects, located about 0.8 km upstream of Kota City in Rajasthan. Water released after power generation at Gandhi Sagar dam, Rana Pratap Sagar dam and Jawahar Sagar Dams, is diverted by Kota Barrage for irrigation in Rajasthan and in Madhya Pradesh through canals on the left and the right sides of the river. The work on this dam was completed in 1960.
The total catchment area of Kota Barrage is 27,332 km2, of which the free catchment area below Jawahar Sagar Dam is just 137 km2. The live storage is 99 MCM. It is an earthfill dam with a concrete spillway. The right and left main canals have a headworks discharge capacity of 188 and 42 m3/s, respectively. The total length of the main canals, branches and distribution system is about 2,342 km, serving an area of 2,290 km2 of CCA. The Barrage operates 18 gates to control flow of flood and canal water downstream, and serves as bridge between parts of Kota on both side of the river.

Mythology
The ancient name of the Chambal was Charmanvati, meaning the river on whose banks leather is dried. In due course of time, this river became famous as the river of ‘charman’ (skin) and was named as Charmanvati.

The epic Sanskrit narrative the Mahabharata, refers to the Chambal river as the Charmanyavati : originating from the blood of thousands of animals sacrificed by the King Rantideva. 
"So large was the number of animals sacrificed in the Agnihotra of that king that the secretions flowing from his kitchen from the heaps of skins deposited there caused a veritable river which from this circumstance, came to be called the Charmanwati''."
Charmanwati was the southern boundary of Panchala Kingdom. King Drupada ruled the southern Panchalas up to the bank of the Charmanwati river.

According to folklore the Chambal area was part of Shakuni's kingdom and the dice-game played thereabouts. After the attempted disrobing of Draupadi (the daughter of Drupada) she cursed anyone who would drink the water of the Charmanwati river. Thus it is believed that due to the curse by Draupadi, have helped the Chambal to survive unpolluted by man, and its many animal inhabitants to thrive relatively untouched. The Chambal remains one of India's most pristine rivers.

See also

Peninsular River System Of India
List of rivers in India

References

External links

Chambal Basin (Department of Irrigation, Government of Rajasthan)
Chambal Valley Project
Chambal River in 1949
Chambal River - Origin Tributaries Dams Flora | Fauna 

 
Rivers of Madhya Pradesh
Rivers of Uttar Pradesh
Geography of Malwa
Rivers of Rajasthan
Tributaries of the Yamuna River
Rivers of India